This is the complete list of men's medalists in athletics at the Summer Olympics. It does not include the medalists from the Athletics at the 1906 Intercalated Games – these are no longer regarded as an official part of the Olympic chronology by the IOC.

Men's events

100 metres

200 metres

400 metres

800 metres

1500 metres

5000 metres

10,000 metres

Marathon 
The distance of the marathon at the Olympics has varied in the early years, before being standardized at 42,195 m in 1924, the distance that was run at the 1908 Olympics. In other years, the distances have been:
 1896: 40,000 m (approximately)
 1900: 
 1904: 
 1912: 
 1920:

110 metres hurdles

400 metres hurdles

3000 metres steeplechase

4 × 100 metres relay

4 × 400 metres relay

20 kilometres race walk

High jump

Pole vault

Long jump

Triple jump

Shot put

Discus throw

Hammer throw

Javelin throw

Decathlon 
At the St. Louis Games in 1904, the decathlon contest was entitled the All-Around competition, and consisted of: 100 yards dash, shot put, high jump, 800 yard walk, hammer throw, pole vault, 120 yards hurdles, 56 pounds weight throw, long jump, and a mile run.

Mixed Events

4 × 400 metres relay

35 Kilometers walk, team

Discontinued events

60 metres

5 miles

200 metres hurdles

2500 metres steeplechase

2590 metres steeplechase

3200 metres steeplechase

4000 metres steeplechase

1600 metres relay 
The first relay event to be held at the Olympics, the 1600 m relay consisted of two legs over 200 m, one over 400 m, and one over 800 m. This "medley" relay was replaced by the 4 × 400 m relay at subsequent Olympics.

3000 metres team race

5000 metres team race

3-mile team race

4-mile team race

Cross country (individual)

Cross country (team)

3000 metres race walk

3500 metres race walk

10 kilometres race walk

10 miles race walk

50 kilometres race walk

Standing high jump

Standing long jump

Standing triple jump

Shot put (two-handed)

Discus throw (Greek style)

Discus throw (two-handed)

Weight throw

Javelin throw (freestyle)

Javelin throw (two-handed) 
This did not involve throwing with both hands. Distances recorded with each hand were added.

Triathlon 
Consisted of long jump, shot put, and 100 yards.

Pentathlon 
Consisted of long jump, javelin throw, 200 metres, discus throw, and 1500 metres.

See also

Athletics at the 1906 Intercalated Games — these Intercalated Games are no longer regarded as official Games by the International Olympic Committee
List of Asian Games medalists in athletics
List of Commonwealth Games medallists in athletics (men)
List of men's Olympic and World Championship athletics sprint champions

Notes

References

Results
International Olympic Committee results database
Olympic listings from IAAF 2013 statistical handbook

Athletics men
medalists
Olympic men

Athletics men
Olympic medalists